Brandon Walker (born 17 October 2002) is an Australian rules football player who plays for Fremantle in the Australian Football League (AFL).

A member of Fremantle's Next Generation Academy (NGA) due to being born in Ghana,  Walker was drafted with the 50th selection in the 2020 national draft, when Fremantle matched Essendon's bid. He had played junior football for East Fremantle and represented Western Australia at Under 16 and Under 18 levels. His twin brother, Chris, also plays football for East Fremantle.

He was selected to make his AFL debut for Fremantle in round 13 of the 2021 AFL season against Gold Coast, alongside fellow 2020 draftee and NGA member, Joel Western. Walker received a 2022 AFL Rising Star nomination for his round 13 performance against Hawthorn at Optus Stadium.

Statistics
 Statistics are correct to the end of round 10, 2022

|- style="background-color: #EAEAEA"
! scope="row" style="text-align:center" | 2021
|
| 31 || 10 || 0 || 3 || 72 || 32 || 104 || 36 || 17 || 0.0 || 0.3 || 7.2 || 3.2 || 10.4 || 3.6 || 1.7
|-
! scope="row" style="text-align:center" | 2022
|
| 31 || 7 || 0 || 0 || 50 || 28 || 78 || 15 || 16 || 0.0 || 0.0 || 7.1 || 4.0 || 11.1 || 2.1 || 2.3
|- class="sortbottom"
! colspan=3| Career
! 17
! 0
! 3
! 122
! 60
! 182
! 51
! 33
! 0.0
! 0.2
! 7.2
! 3.5
! 10.7
! 3.0
! 1.9
|}

Notes

References

External links

 
WAFL player profile

2002 births
Living people
Fremantle Football Club players
Peel Thunder Football Club players
Australian rules footballers from Western Australia
Ghanaian emigrants to Australia
Australian twins
Twin sportspeople
AFL Academy graduates